An air and light unit, also known as a breathing support unit, is a specialized piece of firefighting apparatus used by firefighters to provide supplemental lighting and SCBA air bottles at the scene of an emergency. During prolonged emergencies, particularly structure fires, where firefighters must remain on air (wearing their SCBAs), these air bottles will need to be replaced and refilled. The air and light unit has the ability to refill the SCBA bottles while in the field using onboard air compressors (cascade). It also carries a supply of spare air cylinders. These units are highly customizable and can vary greatly between departments. These multifunctional units are also equipped with diesel generators which supply electricity to power portable lights and overall scene illumination equipment. This is usually done via a roof-mounted telescoping light bank. The unit also has the ability to supply electrical power in an emergency to a shelter, base camp, or medical facility.

In the United States, Chapter 24 of National Fire Protection Association regulation 1901 outlines specifications for any air system mounted on firefighting apparatus.

References

Fire service vehicles